Zoë Paul is a South African-born, Athens-based sculptor and painter. She combines traditional techniques with products of industrial waste to examine community, craft and domestic spaces.

Early life and education 
Zoë Paul's parents came to Greece from South Africa during the apartheid era. Paul, born in 1987 in South Africa, grew up in the United Kingdom and Greece, on an island of Kythira. Due to her family's limited resources at the time, Paul learned how to work with various materials at an early age. She studied sculpture at Camberwell College of Arts, where she received her BA, and at Royal College of Art in London, where she earned her MA.

Work and career 
Paul uses sculpture, drawing, and textile to explore domestic spaces. Her work is particularly inspired by blurred lines between the interior and the exterior. As Paul is a trained sculptor, her art has also been influenced by Classical Greek sculpture.

Exhibitions
Paul's solo exhibition La Perma-Perla Kraal Emporium, which explores hospitality and community, has been hosted at The Breeder gallery in Athens  and at the Spike Island Artspace in Bristol, UK. A distinctive feature of this exhibition was a long table where Paul invited visitors to join her at rolling clay beads while drinking sage tea. The clay beads were also used to create bead curtains, which were part of Paul's exhibition and are a recurring theme throughout her work.

Her collaboration with a British painter Faye Wei Wei , exhibition Marzanna, Yours Again was hosted at Hot Wheels Projects in Athens . This exhibition was inspired by Eastern European mythology and folkloric rituals of making dolls to invite the arrival of spring.

Paul's work has also been included in the Unorthodox exhibition at the Jewish Museum (Manhattan) and in The Equilibrists exhibition at the Benaki Museum in Athens.

References 

Alumni of the Royal College of Art
21st-century South African painters
21st-century South African sculptors
1987 births
Living people
Alumni of Camberwell College of Arts
South African emigrants to Greece
People from Kythira
Artists from Athens
South African women painters
South African women sculptors